Ethan may refer to:

People
Ethan (given name)

Places
Ethan, South Dakota
Fort Ethan Allen (Arlington, Virginia)

Fiction
Ethan of Athos, 1986 novel by Lois McMaster Bujold
"Ethan Brand", 1850 short story by Nathaniel Hawthorne
Ethan Frome, 1911 novel by Edith Wharton

See also
Eitan (disambiguation)
Etan (disambiguation)
Ethen (disambiguation)
Ethan Allen (disambiguation)
Ethane